The Brazil women's national football team has represented Brazil at the FIFA Women's World Cup on eight occasions in 1991, 1995, 1999, 2003, 2007, 2011, 2015 and 2019. They were runners-up once. They also reached the third place once.

FIFA World Cup record

1991 World Cup

For the World Cup Women's Women qualified as South American Champion. For this they had to play in two games against Venezuela and Chile and won both games (6: 0 and 6: 1).

On November 17, 1991, they played in Foshan their first World Cup match and won against Japan 1–0. Elane scored the first World Cup goal for the Brazilians. In the second game followed then a 0: 5 against the United States. After a 0–2 draw against Sweden in the last group match Brazil became group third and dropped out with it.

Group B

1995 World Cup

The Brazilians for the world cup through South American champions. With four wins against Argentina, Chile, Ecuador and Bolivia Brazil became group winners against Argentina, but then had to compete again against Argentina in the final and also won this 2–0.

At the World Cup,  Brazil started again with a 1–0 victory, this time against Sweden. Then they lost against Japan with 1: 2 and Germany with 1: 6. Thus, Brazil equalized with Japan, but the worse goal difference only the fourth place.

Group A

1999 World Cup
All CONMEBOL members had registered for the third World Cup or qualifying South America Champion, so they played in two groups. Brazil prevailed in its group with four wins against Peru, Colombia, Chile and Venezuela. Ecuador were defeated 11–1 in the semi-finals and 7–1 in the final. Argentina then failed to win against Mexico in the Inter-American play-offs, which made Mexico the first to qualify.

Mexico was then in the USA kick-off opponents of Brazil and lost 1–7. Pretinha and Sissi scored three goals each. This time, however, Brazil also won the second game: Italy was defeated 2–0. After a 3: 3 draw against Germany, Brazil were group winners on goal difference and scored in the quarter-finals Nigeria. After 35 minutes it was 3-0 for Brazil, but since the Africans scored in the second half and three goals, there was an extension. In this Sissi then succeeded the Golden goal for 4: 3. In the semifinals against the host USA was then lost but with 0: 2.
 The USA then became World Champion for the second time. Brazil reached third place in the small final against defeated defending champion Norway by a penalty shoot-out win.

Group B

Quarter-finals

Semi-finals

Third place play-off

2003 World Cup
Actually, the 2003 World Cup should take place again in People's Republic of China. Due to the SARS epidemic, the tournament was temporarily relocated to the United States. Thus the World Cup took place for the second time in the USA. In the Qualification, which was again held as South American champions, Brazil only had to compete in the last four rounds, for which the other three teams will qualify first had. With three wins against Argentina, Colombia and Peru qualified Brazil as a South American champions for the World Cup, but also the runners-up Argentina could book the World Cup ticket.

In the US, they met in the first group match South Korea and won 3–0. Against Norway then followed a 4–1 win and with a 1–1 draw against France was reached as a group first the quarterfinals. Here Sweden was the opponent and with a 1: 2 difference Brazil. Sweden then reached the final, but then lost by the first Golden goal in a women's World Cup game against Germany with the German women for the first time became world champion.

Group B

Quarter-finals

2007 World Cup
Four years later, the World Cup took place for the second time in the People's Republic of China. In the 2006 South American Women's Football Championship, which once again served as Qualification, the 10 CONMEBOL members initially played four teams in two groups of five for the finals. Brazil first met Paraguay, Venezuela, Peru and Bolivia. With four victories, Brazil reached the final round, but was there only second behind Argentina in front of Uruguay and Paraguay. With that Argentina and Brazil drove again to the World Cup.

In the final, they met in the first game New Zealand and won 5: 0. Against hosts China then followed a 4-0 and Denmark was defeated 1–0. This Brazil reached the quarter-finals as group winners. In a varied game, Australia was beaten 3–2 to reach the semi-final against the USA. Here, Brazil managed to give the USA their highest international defeat 4–0. Brazil reached its first World Cup final for the first time, making it the third nation after Germany and Sweden to do so for men and women. The opponent was defending champion Germany, who had reached the final without conceding, scoring the highest ever World Cup win of the season with a 11–0 draw against Argentina in the opening match. After a goalless first half Birgit Prinz succeeded in the 52nd minute with their 14th goal of the World Cup 1–0 lead. In the 64th minute Cristiane was fouled in the German penalty area. However, Marta's penalties failed Nadine Angerer). The following attacks could not use the Brazilians in goals, as the German defense was safe. Four minutes from time, the decision was made: After a corner, Simone Laudehr headed the ball 2–0. Thus defended the German team as the first in a women's World Cup title. The runner-up is the best placement so far for Brazil. In addition, Marta received the Golden Boot as the top scorer and the Golden Ball as the best player of the tournament.

Group D

Quarter-finals

Semi-finals

Final

2011 World Cup
For the World Cup in Germany, the Brazilians qualified again as the winner of 2010 South American Women's Football Championship. With four wins in the preliminary round first Colombia, Paraguay, Venezuela and Uruguay were distanced. In the final round, there are three wins against Colombia, Chile and Argentina, who surprisingly lost against Colombia on the final day of the match, giving Colombia instead of Argentina the World Cup ticket.

In Germany, Brazil was in a group with World Cup newcomer Equatorial Guinea, Norway and Australia solved. A 1–0 win over Australia and a 3–0 win over Norway would have been enough to draw against the newcomer from the other side of the Atlantic, but they also won that match 3–0, leaving Brazil without a clean sheet with nine Points group winner was. In the quarter-finals, they met the American women, who had become second only to the group for the first time. Brazil fell behind with a Daiane own goal in the second minute, but were able to equalize in the 68th minute when Marta converted a penalty. The Brazilians were lucky, because although Hope Solo held the first penalty shot by Cristiane, referee Jacqui Melksham had this but repeat because a US player had run too early into the box, and the then approaching Marta was ultimately successful. In addition, the US had to play in underage, as Rachel Buehler had also received the red card for the penalties leading to the penalty. It remained until the end of regular time at 1-1, which gave it an extension. In this Marta scored after just two minutes, the 2–1 lead for Brazil. In the second minute of extra time of extra time Abby Wambach succeeded after a long cross by Megan Rapinoe but still the 2-2 equalizer. Brazil lost 5–3 on penalties

Group D

Quarter-finals

2015 World Cup
Four years later, the World Cup took place for the second time in the People's Republic of China. In the 2014 Copa América Femenina, which once again served as Qualification, the 10 CONMEBOL members initially played four teams in two groups of five for the finals. Brazil first met Paraguay, Venezuela, Peru and Bolivia. With four victories, Brazil reached the final round, but was there only second behind Argentina in front of Uruguay and Paraguay. With that Argentina and Brazil drove again to the World Cup.

In the draw of the groups the Brazilians were set and were "assigned" to the group E. As group opponents were allocated South Korea as well as the World Cup newcomers Spain and Costa Rica.

In the group, the Brazilians prevailed without loss of point, beat South Korea 2–0, Spain 1-0 and Costa Rica also 1–0. In the second round they were then defeated Australia 0-1 and elimated.

Group E

Round of 16

2019 World Cup
In the Qualification, the Brazilians prevailed in the Sudamericano Femenino 2018. After two games of the final round of the top four teams, the World Cup participation was no longer to take. Victory in the last game against Colombia also defended the title.

Group opponents in France were Australia, Italy and Jamaica. After the Brazilians have not won a game since July 2018, they could win against Jamaica without World Cup top goalscorer Marta 3–0. All goals scored Cristiana, who had not played since winning the South American Championship international match. In the second game against Australia, they went 2–0 in the lead, with Marta scored the first goal and her 16th goal of the World Cup with a transformed penalty, equaling with Miroslav Klose, the men's world record scorer. In extra time in the first half, the Australians were able to score the goal and in the second half, to which Marta was substituted, turn the game and win 3–2. The third goal came from an own goal by Mônica. In the third match against Italy, the Brazilians won by a Marta-converted penalty. With Australia beating Jamaica 4–1 on aggregate, losing 2–1 to Italy in the first game and defeating Jamaica 5–0, the three sides tied. Italy's group winners and Australia finished second with a goal more scored with the same goal difference as Brazil. The Brazilians also qualified as the best group third for the round of 16 where they met hosts France. With 1: 2 after extra time they lost against the French, against whom they could not win before in eight matches.

Group C

Round of 16

2023 World Cup

Group F

Goalscorers 

 Own goals scored for opponents
 Daiane (scored for United States in 2011)
 Mônica (scored for Australia in 2019)

Notes

References

 
World Cup
Countries at the FIFA Women's World Cup